Far Be It from Me is the debut solo studio album by Australian singer-songwriter Tex Perkins. The album was released in August 1996 and peaked at number 42 on the ARIA Charts.

Track listing

Charts

Release history

References

1996 debut albums
Tex Perkins albums
Polydor Records albums